Joseph or Joe Donnelly could refer to: 

Joseph Donnelly (cricketer), Irish cricketer
Joseph Francis Donnelly (1909–1977), American Roman Catholic bishop
Joey Donnelly (1909–1992), Irish footballer
Sir Brian Donnelly (British diplomat) (Joseph Brian Donnelly, born 1945), British diplomat
Joe Donnelly (rower) (born 1951), Australian rower
Joe Donnelly (born 1955), American politician